Iradj, a variant of Iraj, is a given name. Notable people with the name include:

Iradj Alexander (born 1975), Swiss race car driver
Iradj Fazel (born 1939), Iranian surgeon and academic
Iradj Gandjbaksh (born 1941), Iranian cardiac surgeon

See also
Iraj, a shah